Bartłomiej Sienkiewicz (born 29 July 1961) is a Polish politician who served as the minister of interior from 25 February 2013 to 22 September 2014.

Early life and education
Sienkiewicz was born on 29 July 1961. He is the great-grandson of Nobel Prize–winning author Henryk Sienkiewicz. Bartłomiej Sienkiewicz is a graduate of Jagiellonian University.

Career
Sienkiewicz participated in Cracow’s opposition movement in the early 1980s. In 1990, he co-established the Office for State Protection and the Centre for Eastern Studies, a think-tank organization. He served as the deputy director of the center for eight years, specifically from 1991 to 1993 and from 1996 to 2001. In the early 2000s, he left the state administration and began to work in private sector, founding a firm on the investment risk and analysis of the competitive environment (ASBS Othago, then "Sienkiewicz and Partners").

On 25 February 2013, Sienkiewicz was appointed by President Bronisław Komorowski as interior minister to the cabinet led by Prime Minister Donald Tusk. Sienkiewicz replaced Jacek Cichocki in the post.

Sienkiewicz was one of the politicians at the centre of the tape scandal that occurred in Poland in the summer of 2014 when many of the key figures of the Polish political scene were covertly recorded in private. He was recorded during a conversation with Marek Belka, governor of the National Bank of Poland, during which they discussed possible change of the finance minister.

He resigned along with the entire government following the election of Donald Tusk as the new President of the European Council and did not enter the new cabinet headed by Ewa Kopacz.

Personal life
Sienkiewicz is married and has four children.

References

External links

	

20th-century Polish businesspeople
1961 births
Polish corporate directors
Jagiellonian University alumni
Interior ministers of Poland
Living people
Politicians from Kielce
Members of the Polish Sejm 2019–2023
21st-century Polish businesspeople